is a 1980 arcade video game developed and published by Sega. N-Sub was later ported by Sega as a launch game for the SG-1000 in 1983  though as with all SG-1000 games, it only saw a release in Japan and PAL regions.

Gameplay
The object of the game is to maneuver an on-screen submarine, the "N-Sub," with the joystick and sink the enemy fleet with torpedo fire in the Cobalt Blue Sea. The player can fire torpedoes vertically and horizontally from their submarines by pressing two separate "FIRE" buttons. The player can hold the button longer to fire three torpedoes in rapid succession. Enemy ships attack the N-Sub with missiles, torpedoes and depth charges. A round of gameplay ends when the player defeats a wave of twelve enemy ships. Successive rounds increase in difficulty. The player has multiple lives, or chances to continue after being hit by an enemy ship, and can receive more lives by reaching high scores. The game ends when the player exhausts their lives.

References

1980 video games
Arcade video games
Naval video games
Sega arcade games
SG-1000 games
Sega video games
Submarine simulation video games
Submarines in fiction
Video games developed in Japan